Giacomo Filippo Crivelli (died 1466) was a Roman Catholic prelate who served as Bishop of Novara (1457–1466).

Biography
On 30 May 1457, Giacomo Filippo Crivelli was appointed during the papacy of Pope Callixtus III as Bishop of Novara.'
He served as Bishop of Novara until his death in 1466.

While bishop, he was the principal consecrator of Walter Supersaxo, Bishop of Sion (1459).

References

External links and additional sources
 (for Chronology of Bishops) 
 (for Chronology of Bishops) 

15th-century Italian Roman Catholic bishops
Bishops appointed by Pope Callixtus III
1466 deaths